Substituted phenethylamines (or simply phenethylamines) are a chemical class of organic compounds that are based upon the phenethylamine structure; the class is composed of all the derivative compounds of phenethylamine which can be formed by replacing, or substituting, one or more hydrogen atoms in the phenethylamine core structure with substituents.

The structural formula of any substituted phenethylamine contains a phenyl ring that is joined to an amino (NH) group via a two-carbon sidechain. Hence, any substituted phenethylamine can be classified according to the substitution of hydrogen (H) atoms on phenethylamine's phenyl ring, sidechain, or amino group with a specific group of atoms.

Many substituted phenethylamines are psychoactive drugs which belong to a variety of different drug classes, including central nervous system stimulants (e.g., amphetamine), hallucinogens (e.g., 3,4,5-trimethoxyphenethylamine a.k.a. mescaline), 2,5-dimethoxy-4-methylamphetamine  DOM), entactogen (e.g., MDA), appetite suppressants (e.g. phentermine), nasal decongestants and bronchodilators (e.g., levomethamphetamine and pseudoephedrine), antidepressants (e.g. bupropion and phenelzine), antiparkinson agents (e.g., selegiline), and vasopressors (e.g., ephedrine), among others. Many of these psychoactive compounds exert their pharmacological effects primarily by modulating monoamine neurotransmitter systems; however, there is no mechanism of action or biological target that is common to all members of this subclass.

Numerous endogenous compounds – including hormones, catecholamines such as dopamine and noradrenaline, and many trace amines (e.g. adrenaline, phenethylamine itself, tyramine, thyronamine, and iodothyronamine) – are substituted phenethylamines. Several notable recreational drugs, such as MDMA (ecstasy), methamphetamine, and cathinone, are also members of the class. All of the substituted amphetamines and substituted methylenedioxyphenethylamines are substituted phenethylamines as well.

List of substituted phenethylamines

Detection

See also

Substituted amphetamine
Substituted methylenedioxyphenethylamine
Substituted cathinone
Substituted phenylmorpholine
2Cs, DOx, 25-NB
Substituted tryptamine
PiHKAL

Notes

References

 
Chemical classes of psychoactive drugs